Asad Soltan oghlu Asadov  (22 March 1956, Zangilan, Azerbaijan SSR - 29 October 1991, Khojaly, Azerbaijan) was the National Hero of Azerbaijan and warrior during the First Nagorno-Karabakh War.

Early life and education 
Asadov was born on March  22, 1956  in Turabad village of Zangilan raion of Azerbaijan SSR. In 1975, he completed his secondary education at Mincivan village secondary school. Asadov served in the Soviet Armed Forces. He completed his military service in Krasnokutsky District of Saratov Oblast of Russia. Then he was admitted to the Krasnokutsk Aviation School.

Personal life 
Asadov was married and had four children.

First Nagorno-Karabakh War 
Asad Asadov was the commander of the AN-2 plane of Yevlakh Aviation Company. On October 29, 1991, Asadov flew to the war zone of Nagorno Karabakh with his technical personnel. The AN-2 plane operated by Asadov was shot down by the Armenian militants and the whole crew and passengers were tragically killed.

Honors 
Asad Soltan oghlu Asadov was posthumously awarded the title of the "National Hero of Azerbaijan" by Presidential Decree No. 337 dated 25 November 1992.  

He was buried at a cemetery in Zangilan District. The secondary school in Turabad village of Zangilan raion and one of the streets in Mincivan were named after him.

See also 
 First Nagorno-Karabakh War
 List of National Heroes of Azerbaijan
 Azerbaijani Air and Air Defence Force
 1992 Azerbaijani Mil Mi-8 shootdown

References

Sources 
 Fəxrəddin Quliyev, "Milli qəhrəmanlar", "Məktəb" qəzeti, No.39(304), 20 oktyabr 2014-cü il. səh.1
Vüqar Əsgərov. "Azərbaycanın Milli Qəhrəmanları" (Yenidən işlənmiş II nəşr). Bakı: "Dərələyəz-M", 2010, səh. 96.

1956 births
1991 deaths
Azerbaijani military personnel
Azerbaijani military personnel of the Nagorno-Karabakh War
Azerbaijani military personnel killed in action
National Heroes of Azerbaijan